Baoyang Road is a station on Shanghai Metro Line 3.

Baoyang Road Ferry Terminal is located nearby, servicing Chongming Island.

References

Line 3, Shanghai Metro
Shanghai Metro stations in Baoshan District
Railway stations in China opened in 2006
Railway stations in Shanghai